Live at the Aladdin Las Vegas is a 2003 direct to video film of Prince in concert at the Aladdin Theatre for the Performing Arts.  The concert was recorded December 15, 2002, and features several notable cover versions, an unreleased song and touches on some of his rarely performed back catalog of material.  Special guests included former band associates, Eric Leeds and Sheila E., funk legends Maceo Parker and Greg Boyer, as well as Nikka Costa. The soundcheck contains an excerpt of "The Rainbow Children" from the album of the same name and "Nagoya" from C-Note.  The audio was recorded directly from the mix console of Prince's long time sound engineer, Scottie Baldwin.

Track listing
 Intro / Soundcheck
 "Pop Life"
 "Money Don't Matter 2 Night" / "The Work"
 "Push and Pull" (with Nikka Costa)
 "1+1+1=3" (incl. "Love Rollercoaster" / "Housequake")
 "Strollin'" / "U Want Me" (previously unreleased)
 "Gotta Broken Heart Again"
 "Strange Relationship"
 "Pass the Peas"
 "Whole Lotta Love"
 "Family Name"
 "Take Me with U"
 "The Everlasting Now"
 "Sometimes It Snows In April"
bonus clip: "The Ride"

Band
 Rhonda Smith: Bass and vocals
 Renato Neto: Keys and more keys
 John Blackwell: Drums
 Maceo Parker: Alto saxophone
 Eric Leeds: Tenor saxophone
 Greg Boyer: Trombone
Scottie Baldwin: Audio Engineer

Special guests
 Sheila E.: Percussion and vocals
 Nikka Costa: Vocals
 DJ Dudley D: Turntables

External links 
 

Prince (musician) video albums
2003 video albums
Live video albums
Albums recorded at Planet Hollywood Resort & Casino
2000s English-language films